The second season of the fantasy comedy television series The Good Place,  created by Michael Schur, began airing September 20, 2017, on NBC in the United States. The season is produced by Fremulon, 3 Arts Entertainment, and Universal Television. The season concluded on February 1, 2018, and consisted of 13 episodes. 

The series focuses on Eleanor Shellstrop (Kristen Bell), a deceased young woman who wakes up in the afterlife and is sent by Michael (Ted Danson) to "the Good Place", a heaven-like utopia he designed, in reward for her righteous life. However, she quickly realizes that she was sent there by mistake and must hide her morally imperfect behavior (past and present). William Jackson Harper, Jameela Jamil, and Manny Jacinto co-star as other residents of the Good Place, together with D'Arcy Carden as an artificial being helping the inhabitants. Each of the episodes are listed as "Chapter (xx)" following the opening title card.

Cast

Main

 Kristen Bell as Eleanor Shellstrop, a deceased, selfish saleswoman from Phoenix, Arizona who winds up in the Good Place by mistake. In order to earn her spot, she recruits Chidi to teach her the fundamentals of becoming a better person.
 William Jackson Harper as Chidi Anagonye, a deceased professor of ethics and moral philosophy from Senegal. Assigned as Eleanor's soulmate in Michael's first Good Place experiment, he gives her ethics lessons in an attempt to make her a better person.
 Jameela Jamil as Tahani Al-Jamil, a deceased, wealthy English philanthropist who believes she belongs in the Good Place. She forms an unlikely friendship with Eleanor, who initially dislikes her positive attitude, condescending way of speaking, and tendency to name drop.
 D'Arcy Carden as Janet, a programmed guide and knowledge bank who acts as the Good Place's main source of information and can provide its residents with whatever they desire. Later, Janet gains a more humanlike disposition, and begins to act differently than the way she was designed.
 Carden also plays Bad Janet, a disrespectful version of Janet designed not to respond to residents properly. 
 Manny Jacinto as Jason Mendoza, a deceased amateur DJ and drug dealer from Jacksonville, Florida who winds up in the Good Place by mistake. He is introduced as Jianyu Li, a Taiwanese monk who took a vow of silence. Later, Jason proves to be an immature and unintelligent, but kindhearted Jacksonville Jaguars and Blake Bortles fan. 
 Ted Danson as Michael, a Bad Place architect who runs the Good Place neighborhood in which Eleanor, Chidi, Tahani, and Jason reside. Michael has a deep affinity for the mundane aspects of human life, like playing with paper clips or searching for one's car keys. In the first season finale, it is revealed that he has been tricking the four humans all along and is actually a demon torturing them, though he later teams up with them. "Michael" is a Hebrew name meaning "who is like God?"

Recurring
 Tiya Sircar as Vicky Sengupta, a Bad Place demon who is introduced as the "real Eleanor Shellstrop" in the first attempt of Michael's torture plan.
 Marc Evan Jackson as Shawn, Michael's wicked boss. Shawn gives Michael two chances to pull off the torture experiment, and later turns against him when he finds out about Michael's betrayal. 
 Maribeth Monroe as Mindy St. Claire, a deceased corporate lawyer and cocaine addict who just barely toed the line of earning enough Good Place points before her death and thus was awarded her own private Medium Place.
 Jason Mantzoukas as Derek, a wacky artificial rebound boyfriend created by Janet.
 Rebecca Hazlewood as Kamilah Al-Jamil, Tahani's massively successful and competitive younger sister.
 Maya Rudolph as Judge Gen (short for Hydrogen), an eternal judge who rules on interdimensional matters between the Good Place and the Bad Place.
 Josh Siegal as Glen, a bad place demon who acts as a Good Place resident. Siegal is a writer on the show and stepped into the part initially in the first season when the original actor was unable to secure a travel visa.

Guest
 Leslie Grossman as Donna Shellstrop, Eleanor's mother.
 Dax Shepard as Chet, a Bad Place demon responsible for torturing people guilty of toxic masculinity. Shepard is also the real-life husband of Kristen Bell, who plays Eleanor Shellstrop.

Episodes

Critical reception
The second season received acclaim from critics. On Rotten Tomatoes, it has a rating of 100%, based on 58 reviews, with an average rating of 8.95/10. The site's summary states that "By voluntarily blowing up its premise, The Good Place sets up a second season that proves even funnier than its first." On Metacritic, the second season has a score of 87 out of 100, based on reviews from 10 critics, indicating "universal acclaim".

Television critics' top 10 lists
The Good Place ranked fifth on Metacritic's "Best of 2017: Television Critics' Top 10 Lists". The list is determined by giving a score to each show based on the number of times it appears in year-end top ten lists of various major TV critics and publications.

Accolades
For the 70th Primetime Emmy Awards, the series received two nominations–Ted Danson for Outstanding Lead Actor in a Comedy Series and Maya Rudolph for Outstanding Guest Actress in a Comedy Series. For the 34th TCA Awards, The Good Place won for Outstanding Achievement in Comedy, and received two other nominations–Program of the Year and Individual Achievement in Comedy for Ted Danson.

Ratings

Notes

References

External links
 
 

2017 American television seasons
2018 American television seasons
The Good Place seasons